Apostolos "Apollo" Papathanasiou (born 15 March 1969) is a Swedish heavy metal vocalist of Greek descent, who is currently with the band Spiritual Beggars. He has also sung for Firewind, Meduza, Evil Masquerade, Gardenian, and Richard Andersson's projects Majestic and Time Requiem.

In 2007, Papathanasio had to opt out of certain tour dates with Firewind. His position was temporarily filled by Henning Basse of Metalium. Apollo's last releases with Firewind was "Few Against Many" (2012). On 15 January 2013, Firewind announced that the band had parted ways with Apollo. After his departure from Firewind he's continued on with Spiritual Beggars and released return to zero (2010)  Earth Blues, 15 April 2013 and Sunrise to Sundown (2016).
Papathanasio also works as a music teacher for a school in Halmstad.

Discography

Faith Taboo
1997: Psychopath

Majestic
2000: Trinity Overture

Time Requiem
2002: Time Requiem
2003: Unleashed in Japan
2004: The Inner Circle of Reality

Meduza
2002: Now and Forever
2004: Upon the World

Sandalinas
2005: Living on the Edge

Evil Masquerade
2006: Third Act
2009: Fade to Black
2012: Black Ravens Cry (single)
2012: A Silhouette (single)
2012: Pentagram
2014: 10 Years in the Dark - remastered compilation
2016: The Outcast Hall of Fame

Firewind
2006: Allegiance
2008: The Premonition
2010: Days of Defiance
2012: Few Against Many

Bassinvaders
2008: Hellbassbeaters

Spiritual Beggars
2010: Return to Zero
2013: Earth Blues
2016: Sunrise To Sundown

Apollo (solo)
2016: Waterdevils

Other works
2005: Vitalij Kuprij - Revenge
2010: Sebastien - Tears of White Roses
2011: Nightrage - Insidious
2011: The MFC Dragon Slayer All Star Project - Let's Unite in Rock (single)
2012: Kamelot - Grace (bonus track)

References

External links
Official website of Apollo Papathanasio (archived)
Official website of Evil Masquerade
Record label of Evil Masquerade
Official website of Firewind

Firewind members
Swedish people of Greek descent
Greek heavy metal musicians
Swedish heavy metal musicians
20th-century Swedish male singers
Swedish rock singers
Living people
1969 births
Evil Masquerade members
Spiritual Beggars members